The "Song of the Volga Boatmen" (known in Russian as Эй, ухнем! [Ey, ukhnem!, "Yo, heave-ho!"], after the refrain) is a well-known traditional Russian song collected by Mily Balakirev and published in his book of folk songs in 1866. It was sung by burlaks, or barge-haulers, on the Volga River. Balakirev published it with only one verse (the first). The other two verses were added at a later date. Ilya Repin's famous painting Barge Haulers on the Volga depicts such burlaks in Tsarist Russia toiling along the Volga.

The song was popularized by Feodor Chaliapin, and has been a favorite concert piece of bass singers ever since. Bill Finegan's jazz arrangement for the Glenn Miller band took the song to #1 in the US charts in 1941. Russian composer Alexander Glazunov based one of the themes of his symphonic poem "Stenka Razin" on the song. Spanish composer Manuel de Falla wrote an arrangement of the song, which was published under the name Canto de los remeros del Volga (del cancionero musical ruso) in 1922. He did so at the behest of diplomat Ricardo Baeza, who was working with the League of Nations to provide financial relief for the more than two million Russian refugees who had been displaced and imprisoned during World War I. All proceeds from the song's publication were donated to this effort. Igor Stravinsky made an arrangement for orchestra.

First publications and recordings 
A version of the song was recorded by Mily Balakirev (a Russian composer) from Nikolay Aleynikov in Nizhny Novgorod in 1860 or 1861. Already in 1866, the musician published it in his book A collection of Russian folk songs (1866), with his own arrangement.

The first released version of the song was probably recorded in Russia in 1900 by Alexander Makarov-Yunev on Gramophone (#22086).

Lyrics 

The English lyrics above fit the melody. A more accurate translation of some lines are:

Notable recordings and arrangements 
The song was arranged by Feodor Koenemann for Chaliapin. That Chaliapin's version became one of the most popular in Russia and has been released several times (e.g., in 1922, 1927, 1936).

In 1905, Alexander Glazunov created his piece Ey, ukhnem based on the Balakirev's tune.

In April 1917, Igor Stravinsky was asked by Sergei Diaghilev to orchestrate it for wind instruments, as the opening piece of a concert that would normally have begun with the Russian national anthem "God Save the Tsar", except that Tsar Nicholas II had recently abdicated. Stravinsky worked all night to have the music ready, assisted by Lord Berners and Ernest Ansermet.

Czech composer Vítězslav Novák utilizes the main motif from Song of the Volga Boatmen in his Májová symfonie (May Symphony, Op. 73, 1943), for soloists, mixed chorus, and orchestra.

A translated vocal version was sung by Paul Robeson.

The first two lines of the song, in English, were used in George Formby's 1934 song, Madame Moscovitch.

The Boston Pops Orchestra conducted by Arthur Fiedler recorded the Glazunov arrangement of the tune in New York City on June 30, 1937.

The song, or at least the tune, was popularized in the mid-20th century through an instrumental jazz version played by the Glenn Miller Orchestra. Glenn Miller released the song as an RCA Bluebird 78 single, B-11029-A, in 1941 in a swing jazz arrangement by Bill Finegan which reached no. 1 on the Billboard pop singles chart in a 10-week chart run. Not in copyright, the song was not subject to the 1941 ASCAP boycott, allowing for more radio play that year.

In 1965, Leonid Kharitonov, together with the Russian Red Army Choir, released a recording. Billy Squier included the Volga Boatmen melody as counterpoint in his 1981 song "The Stroke" and may have sampled it from the 1965 Red Army Chorus recording.

 
The memorable melody of "The Song of the Volga Boatmen" was used in various media, generally as background music; a notable example being found in the video game Punch-Out!! for NES where it is the entry theme of the Russian boxer Soda Popinski. Some uses, particularly those portending doom or despair, employ only the iconic four-note beginning; others go so far as to add new, often wryly humorous, lyrics, such as the "Birthday Dirge".

See also 
 List of number-one singles of 1941 (U.S.)

References

External links 

 YouTube: Song of the Volga Boatmen: Performed by Kovcheg Aca Pella; Five males, including two basso profundo.
 .
 YouTube: Song of the Volga Boatmen — sung in the tradition of Chaliapin by Leonid Kharitonov with the Alexandrov Ensemble, 1965.
 YouTube: Song of the Volga Boatmen — Paul Robeson.
 YouTube: Song of the Volga Boatmen — Glenn Miller and his orchestra.
 YouTube: Song of the Volga Boatmen — translated Chinese version performed by the Male Choir of the People's Armed Police.
 YouTube: Song of the Volga Boatmen — Performed by Zivan Saramandic, famous Serbian opera singer and orchestra of Russian folksongs Daniluska.

Russian folk songs
Sea shanties
Songs about rivers
Songs about boats
Songs about occupations
Year of song unknown
Feodor Chaliapin songs
Songs about Russia
1941 singles